All of You may refer to:

Music
 All of You (Ahmad Jamal album), 1961
 All of You (Colbie Caillat album) or the title song, 2011
 "All of You" (Betty Who song), 2015
 "All of You" (Cole Porter song), 1954
 "All of You" (Julio Iglesias and Diana Ross song), 1984
 "All of You", a song by Don Felder from the soundtrack to Heavy Metal, 1981
 "All of You", a song by Duran Duran from Future Past, 2021
 "All of You", a song by Journey South from Journey South, 2006
 "All of You", a song from the Encanto film soundtrack, 2021

Film
 All of You (film), a 2017 Filipino film

See also 
 All of Me (disambiguation)